Ann Marie Hraychuck (July 24, 1951 – June 6, 2021) was an American politician who served as a Democratic Party member of the Wisconsin State Assembly, from Balsam Lake, Wisconsin representing the 28th Assembly District from her 2006 election until 2010. She served as Majority Caucus Secretary. She was defeated in 2010 by Erik Severson.

She died of cancer on June 6, 2021, in Ashley, North Dakota, at age 69.

References

External links
Ann Hraychuck for State Assembly'official campaign website
 
 Follow the Money - Ann Hraychuck
2008 2006 campaign contributions

1951 births
2021 deaths
Democratic Party members of the Wisconsin State Assembly
Women state legislators in Wisconsin
People from Polk County, Wisconsin
21st-century American politicians
21st-century American women politicians
Deaths from cancer in North Dakota